Be with You is a 2018 South Korean romance film starring So Ji-sub and Son Ye-jin, and directed by Lee Jang-hoon. The film is a remake of the 2004 Japanese film of the same name, which is based on a novel by Takuji Ichikawa.

Plot
Soo-ah (Son Ye-jin) before she passed on, makes an unbelievable promise to her husband, Woo-jin (So Ji-sub), to return one year later at the start of the rainy season. Miraculously, she keeps the promise and reappears before her husband and son, but she has no memory recollection. Sadly, the relief at their reunion is short-lived, because it turns out that Soo-ah has to leave her family at the end of the rainy season.

Cast

Main
 So Ji-sub as Jung Woo-jin
 Lee Yoo-jin as young Woo-jin 
 Son Ye-jin as Im Soo-ah
 Kim Hyun-soo as young Soo-ah

Supporting
 Kim Ji-hwan as Jung Ji-ho, the couple's son 
 Ko Chang-seok as Hong-goo
 as young Hong-goo
 Lee Jun-hyeok as Instructor Choi 
 Seo Jeong-yeon as Seo-bin's mom

Special appearances 
 Gong Hyo-jin as Woman in Hanbok
 Park Seo-joon as adult Ji-ho
 Son Yeo-eun as Hyun-jung

Production
The film is based on the Japanese novel Be with You, written by Takuji Ichikawa.

Son Ye-jin and So Ji-sub have previously worked together in the 2001 drama series Delicious Proposal as siblings. Ko Chang-seok and So Ji-sub have also appeared together previously in the 2008 film Rough Cut.

Filming began August 12, 2017 and finished November 12, 2017 in Daejeon, South Korea.

Release 
On March 6, 2018, a promotional press conference was held with the main cast and director in presence.

Be with You was released internationally in 17 countries including: USA, Canada, Britain, Ireland, Australia, New Zealand, Taiwan, Singapore, Taiwan, Vietnam and Malaysia.

The film was released in local theaters on March 14, 2018.

Reception 
According to Korean Film Council, Be with You achieved first place at the local box office on its opening day by attracting 89,758 moviegoers. The film was shown 4,275 times on 989 screens.

During the first weekend of its release, the film sold a total of 682,789 tickets, accounting for 44.6 percent of the weekend tickets and placing first at the weekend box office.

Be with You surpassed 1 million viewers within seven days since its local release and is ahead of popular melo-romance films Architecture 101 and The Beauty Inside which took eight and nine days respectively to achieve 1 million moviegoers.

Throughout the second weekend, the film attracted 576,981 moviegoers at 1,190 screens by placing second at the weekend box office. The total number of ticket sales increased to 1.82 million by the end of the second weekend.

Awards and nominations

References

External links

Be with You at Naver Movies 

2018 films
South Korean romantic fantasy films
2010s romantic fantasy films
Films based on Japanese novels
South Korean remakes of Japanese films
Lotte Entertainment films
Films with live action and animation
Films set in North Chungcheong Province
2010s South Korean films